Kenneth L. Schmitz (1922–2017) was a Canadian philosopher. He was a president of the Metaphysical Society of America (1980).

See also 
 Francis Martin (biblical scholar)

References

20th-century Canadian philosophers
Philosophy academics
Canadian expatriates in the United States
1922 births
2017 deaths
Presidents of the Metaphysical Society of America